Lady Frere (officially Cacadu) is a small town in Chris Hani District Municipality in the Eastern Cape province of South Africa. The town was renamed to Cacadu in 2017 after changes to the country's colonial names. Cacadu, meaning “bulrush water”, is the Xhosa name for the White Kei River, which rises in the district.

History 
The town was established 1879, and became a municipality in 1900. The town was named after the wife of Sir Henry Bartle Frere, governor of the Cape Colony from 1877 to 1880.

References

Populated places in the Emalahleni Local Municipality, Eastern Cape